Auditions is a 1978 American erotic pseudo-documentary directed by Harry Hurwitz (credited as Harry Tampa). It was written by Albert Band and Charles Band, and stars Bonnie Werchan, Rick Cassidy and Linnea Quigley. Hurwitz also appears in the film as the director, although he is not credited. The film follows the process of casting actors and actresses for a pornographic film. Although several actual porn stars are in the film, it does not depict any actual sexual acts. It was remade in 1999 as Auditions from Beyond.

Plot
During the week of March 15, 1978, an ad appeared in the Hollywood Variety that the producers of films Cinderella (1977) and Fairy Tales (1978) were on the talent search for their new motion picture Fairytales Part II. They were looking for "the world's sexiest woman" for the role of Sleeping Beauty, "the world's sexiest man for the co-starring role of Prince Charming and "the world's most unusual act or personality". Two sets were constructed in a Hollywood studio: a medieval dungeon and a French boudoir. Across from these sets was a mirrored wall behind which cameras and sound equipment was concealed. Hundreds of people responded to the advertisement and on March 25 the two days of auditions began.

Cast
 Bonnie Werchan as Tracy Matthews
 Rick Cassidy as Charlie White
 Linnea Quigley as Sally Webster
 Jennifer West as Melinda Sale
 William Margold as Larry Krantz
 Rhonda Jo Petty as Patty Rhodes 
 Cory Brandon as Van Scott
 Greg Travis as Billy Bob Jr.
 Adore O'Hara as Adore O'Hara
 Maria Lutra as Jenny Marino
 Ric Lutze as Ron Wilaon
 Joey Camen as Joey
 Michael Hardin as Vinnie Maluccio
 Harry Hurwitz as director (uncredited)

Release

Home media
Auditions were first released on VHS tape in 1978. Full Moon re-released the film on DVD on December 6, 2011 as a part of its "Full Moon's Grindhouse" series of exploitation films.

References

External links 
 
 

1978 films
1978 comedy films
American comedy films
American mockumentary films
1970s English-language films
Films directed by Harry Hurwitz
Films scored by Richard Band
Films scored by Joel Goldsmith
1970s American films